The Varaita is a  river of the Province of Cuneo in northwest Italy. It is the first right tributary of the Po River.

Geography
Having entered the plains of the Po valley it joins the Po near Casalgrasso.

Regime
The regime is typical of an Alpine torrent: the flow is at its greatest in spring and in autumn while being drastically reduced during the summer.

Notes
This article was originally translated from its counterpart in the Italian Wikipedia, specifically from this version.

Rivers of the Province of Cuneo
Rivers of Italy
Rivers of the Alps